Horace (65 BC–8 BC) was a Roman poet.

Horace may also refer to:
Horace (given name)

Places
Horace, Indiana
Horace, Kansas
Horace, Nebraska
Horace, North Dakota
Horace (crater), a crater on Mercury

Other uses
Horace (play), a 1640 play by Pierre Corneille
Horace (television play), 1972 British play by Roy Minton
Horace (video game), a video game developed by Paul Helman and published by 505 Games
Horace (video game series), a 1980s video game series
Horace, an 1840 novel by George Sand

See also
Horatio (disambiguation)
Horus (disambiguation)